There has been one Alison Baronetcy.

Alison of Possil House, Devon 
 Sir Archibald Alison, 1st Baronet (1792–1867) 
 Sir Archibald Alison, 2nd Baronet (1826–1907)
Sir Archibald Alison, 3rd Baronet (1862–1921)
Sir Archibald Alison, 4th Baronet (1888–1967)
Sir Frederick Black Alison, 5th Baronet (1893–1970)

Sources

 

Extinct baronetcies in the Baronetage of the United Kingdom